"Noć za nas (A night for us)" is a song recorded by Serbian pop recording artist Dara Bubamara and rap artist Stefan Cvijović Cvija. It was self-released 1 December 2011, Cvija self-released. The song was written by Stefan Cvijović Cvija. It was produced and recorded in Belgrade.

Other versions

 Bulgarian singer Malina made a Bulgarian version of song named "Amneziya (Amnesia)" and released it in 2014. The song doesn't contain a rap part which is sung by Cvija in Serbian version.

References

External links
Noć za nas at Discogs

2011 singles
2011 songs